UEFA Striker, known in North America as Striker Pro 2000, is a sports video game developed by Rage Software and published by Infogrames in 1999-2000. It is the final game in the Striker series following the cancellation of its sequel, UEFA 2001, the following year.

Development
Julian Widdows, a producer at Rage Software, told Dreamcast Monthly magazine that the team's intention was to "create something that felt like real football" and to allow players to "be able to draw the defenders the same way you do in real life, to make space and to make moves".  The title was initially developed under the title Ruud Gullit's Striker, with Ruud Gullit involved on a "consultancy basis" and providing commentary, but this shifted when the UEFA licence was acquired.

Gameplay
The game allows players to choose from 51 European national teams, 44 domestic clubs and 20 "bonus teams", with individual players modelled with 16 different attributes. Players also have the ability to create their own teams and kits, edit existing players and edit the names of existing cups and leagues. Game modes include training, friendly matches, knockout cups, classic matches, leagues and tournaments. The UEFA licence enabled the inclusion of official Euro 2000 qualifying matches and the final tournament as a game mode, but other major cups and leagues are "cunningly disguised" with names such as the Euro Super Trophy standing in for the Champion's League. Commentary is provided by Ron Atkinson and Jonathan Pearce, with Ruud Gullit providing analysis before international fixtures.

Reception

The PlayStation version received favourable reviews, while the Dreamcast version received average reviews, according to the review aggregation website GameRankings. In Japan, where the latter was ported and published by Imagineer on 6 April 2000 under the name , Famitsu gave it a score of 24 out of 40.

Cancelled sequel
A follow up, UEFA 2001, was announced for the Dreamcast in 2000, but was cancelled in October 2000 when Infogrames was re-evaluating their Dreamcast support, and the game was never released on any platform.

References

External links
 

1999 video games
Association football video games
Dreamcast games
Imagineer games
Infogrames games
PlayStation (console) games
Rage Games games
Video game sequels
Video games developed in the United Kingdom
Video games set in 2000
Multiplayer and single-player video games